The Roman Catholic Diocese of Floriano is a suffragan Latin diocese in the Ecclesiastical province of Teresina, in northeastern Brazil.

Its cathedral episcopal see is Cathedral São Pedro de Alcântara, dedicated to Peter of Alcantara, in the city of Floriano, Piauí state.

Statistics 
As per 2014, it pastorally served 162,100 Catholics (80.0% of 202,600 total) on 48,559 km² in 29 parishes and 3 missions with 29 priests (14 diocesan, 15 religious), 31 lay religious (15 brothers, 16 sisters) and 7 seminarians.

History 
 27 February 2008: Established as Diocese of Floriano, on territory split off from the Diocese of Oeiras–Floriano (with its incumbent transferred as first bishop).

Episcopal ordinaries
(all Roman rite)

''Suffragan Bishops of Floriano 
 Augusto Alves da Rocha (27 February 2008 - retired 17 March 2010), previously Bishop of Picos (Brazil) (1975.05.23 – 2001.10.24), Bishop of mother see Roman Catholic Diocese of Oeiras–Floriano (Brazil) (2001.10.24 – 2008.02.27) 
 Valdemir Ferreira dos Santos (17 March 2010 – 4 May 2016), next Bishop of Amargosa (Brazil) (2016.05.04 – ...)
 Edivalter Andrade (2017.03.29 – ...), no previous prelature.

See also 
 List of Catholic dioceses in Brazil

Sources and external links 
 GCatholic.org, wuth Google map & satellite photo - data for all sections
 Catholic Hierarchy

Roman Catholic dioceses in Brazil
Christian organizations established in 2008
Roman Catholic Ecclesiastical Province of Teresina
Roman Catholic dioceses and prelatures established in the 21st century